Sand Creek Township is one of nine townships in Decatur County, Indiana. As of the 2010 census, its population was 3,120 and it contained 1,331 housing units.

History
Sand Creek Township was organized in 1825.

Westport Covered Bridge was added to the National Register of Historic Places in 1982.

Geography

Cities and towns
 Westport

Unincorporated towns
 Gaynorsville
 Harper
 Harris City
 Letts
 Letts Corner
 Mapleton Corner
 Neff Corner
 Pinhook
(This list is based on USGS data and may include former settlements.)

Adjacent townships
 Washington Township (northeast)
 Marion Township (east)
 Columbia Township, Jennings County (southeast)
 Sand Creek Township, Jennings County (south)
 Jackson Township (west)
 Clay Township (northwest)

Major highways
  Indiana State Road 3

Cemeteries
The township contains seven cemeteries: Eddleman, Finley, Horseshoe Bend, Mapleton, Old Burk (aka Vanderbur Cemetery), Rodney and Westport.

References
 United States Census Bureau cartographic boundary files
 U.S. Board on Geographic Names

External links

 Indiana Township Association
 United Township Association of Indiana

Townships in Decatur County, Indiana
Townships in Indiana
1825 establishments in the United States
Populated places established in 1825